The Stolpersteine in the Lake Constance district lists all Stolpersteine that have been collocated in Friedrichshafen and Überlingen in the Bodenseekreis ("Lake Constance district") in the very South of Germany. Stolpersteine is the German name for stumbling blocks collocated all over Europe by German artist Gunter Demnig. They remember the fate of the Nazi victims being murdered, deported, exiled or driven to suicide.

Friedrichshafen

Schloss Spetzgart

Überlingen

Dates of collocations 
The Stolpersteine in the Bodenseekreis were collocated by the artist himself on the following dates:
 9 April 2009: Überlingen, Bahnhofstraße 4
 13 July 2010: Überlingen, Altenheim St. Ulrich
 9 September 2013: Friedrichshafen
 21 May 2014: Schloss Spetzgart; Überlingen, Münsterstraße 12

See also 
 List of cities by country that have stolpersteine

References

External links 

 stolpersteine.eu, Demnig's website

Lake Constance district
Stolpersteine
Holocaust commemoration